Shijiazhuang Luancheng Airport  is a small airport serving Shijiazhuang, the capital of Hebei province, China. It is located near Luancheng, the head of the Luancheng District in the Hebei province.
The main airport serving Shijiazhuang is Shijiazhuang Zhengding International Airport.

See also
 Shijiazhuang Zhengding International Airport
 List of airports in China

References

External links
 Official website

Airports in Hebei
Buildings and structures in Shijiazhuang
Airports established in 1995
1995 establishments in China